Francis Burkitt may refer to:
 Francis Crawford Burkitt, English theologian
 Francis Hassard Burkitt, Irish Anglican priest